Eupithecia antivulgaria is a moth in the family Geometridae. It is found in Japan.

References

Moths described in 1965
antivulgaria
Moths of Japan